Nina Banks is an American economist who is an associate professor of economics at Bucknell University and former president of the National Economic Association. She is known for her research on the contributions of early women economists, particularly Sadie Alexander. She has also published work explaining the economic value of Black women's community activism.

Selected works 

 Banks, Nina. "Democracy, Race, And Justice: The Speeches And Writing Of Sadie T. M. Alexander." Yale University Press, 2021
Banks, Nina, Geoffrey Schneider, and Paul Susman. "Paying the bills is not just theory: service learning about a living wage." Review of Radical Political Economics 37, no. 3 (2005): 346–356.
 Banks, Nina. "Uplifting The Race Through Domesticity: Capitalism, African-American Migration, And The Household Economy In The Great Migration Era Of 1916—1930." Feminist Economics 12, no. 4 (2006): 599–624.
 Banks, Nina. "Black women and racial advancement: The economics of Sadie Tanner Mossell Alexander." The Review of Black Political Economy 33, no. 1 (2005): 9-24.
 Banks, Nina. "The Black worker, economic justice and the speeches of Sadie TM Alexander." Review of Social Economy 66, no. 2 (2008): 139–161.

References

External links
Nina Banks On the C-SPAN Networks

African-American economists
Hood College alumni
American women economists
Living people
University of Massachusetts Amherst College of Social and Behavioral Sciences alumni
Year of birth missing (living people)
Presidents of the National Economic Association
21st-century African-American scientists
21st-century African-American women
21st-century American economists
21st-century American women scientists
African-American women scientists